Sini Karjalainen (born 30 January 1999) is a Finnish ice hockey player and member of the Finnish national ice hockey team, currently playing with the Vermont Catamounts of Hockey East in the NCAA Division I.

International play 
Karjalainen played with the Finnish women's national U18 team at the IIHF World Women's U18 Championships in 2015, 2016, and 2017.

She was officially named to the Finnish roster for the 2020 IIHF Women's World Championship on 4 March 2020, before the tournament was cancelled on 7 March 2020 due to public health concerns related to the COVID-19 pandemic. The 2020 World Championship would have been Karjalainen's debut with the Finnish national team at an IIHF-organized international tournament; she appeared on the national roster for various Euro Hockey Tour tournaments, first in 2016.

She ultimately debuted with the senior national at the 2021 IIHF Women's World Championship as an alternate defenseman on the 25-player roster and skated in five games.

Career statistics

Regular season and playoffs

International

Awards and honors

References

External links 
 
 

1999 births
Living people
Finnish expatriate ice hockey players in the United States
Finnish women's ice hockey defencemen
Ice hockey players at the 2022 Winter Olympics
Medalists at the 2022 Winter Olympics
Olympic bronze medalists for Finland
Olympic ice hockey players of Finland
Olympic medalists in ice hockey
People from Posio
RoKi Naiset players
Sportspeople from Lapland (Finland)
Team Kuortane players
Vermont Catamounts women's ice hockey players